Ikatan Cinta (English: The Tie of Love) is an Indonesian television series which premiered 19 October 2020 on RCTI. It starred Amanda Manopo, Arya Saloka, Evan Sanders, and Glenca Chysara.

Plot 
Ikatan Cinta narrates the tale of two siblings, Andin (Amanda Manopo) and Elsa (Glenca Chysara), who were secretly in love with Nino (Evan Sanders). After Elsa learns that Nino was getting married to Andin, their already strained relationship takes a turn for the worst. She opposes her sister's engagement to Nino. With the help of Andin's father, Surya (Surya Saputra), Andin carries out her desire to wed Nino. Despite the opposition of Elsa and Sarah (Natasha Dewanti), her mother. 

Andin then learns that Nino and Elsa were once lovers. Elsa was her mother's favorite child, and because of this, anything she desires will be granted. Elsa exploited the circumstance. Many of Elsa's cunning plans got into motion. The bond between Nino and Andin is unaffected by this though. Both of them eventually gets married.

Elsa accuses Andin of murdering Roy (Fiki Alman) while carrying Roy's child. Andin was imprisoned even though Elsa was the one who killed Roy and was truly expecting his child . Elsa also uses this stipulation to win back Nino's affection. Elsa weds Nino at last.

Nindi (Ariqa Fakhira Shakila), Andin's child with Nino, was born while she was in prison. Nino, who believes Nindi to be Roy's son, does not want to care for the youngster. Knowing that Nindi is Nino's child, Elsa ultimately dumps Nindi into an orphanage while claiming that Nindi has passed away.

Cast

Main
 Amanda Manopo as Andini Kharisma Putri Alfahri
 Glenca Chysara as Elsa Anindita Prasetya
 Arya Saloka as Aldebaran Alfahri
 Evan Sanders as Elnino Prasetya

Recurring
 Surya Saputra as Surya Lesmana
 Natasha Dewanti as Sarah Aurelia
 Ivanka Suwandi as Karina Larasati
 Sari Nila as Rossa Alfahri
 Ayya Renita as Kiki Aminarti
 Chika Waode as Mirna
 Ikbal Fauzi as Abdullah Rendy
 Jantuk as Uya
 Ariqa Fakhira Shakila as Nindi Kirani/Reyna
 Nadya Arina as Catherine Yulia Permadi
 Felix William Smith as Haryo Chandrawijaya
 Ziandru Alshad Arrajab / Muhammad Raffasya Saputra / Bianconeri Azhari as Askara Putra Alfahri
 Mayang Yudittia as Michelle Suwandi Permadi
 Raquel Katie as Siena Taliana
 Fara Shakila as Reyna Putri Alfahri
 Kevin Hillers as Erlangga Permadi
 Dini Vitri as Mayang
 Larasati Nugroho as Jessica Anabella Adicipta
 Ichal Muhammad as Bagas Fonseca
 Masran Sadindro as Dimas
 Christian Loho as Fajar
 Eriska Rein as Bella
 Reuben Elishama as Darren Abimana Abila
 Angga Ryan Putra as Sammy
 Anes Morgana as Ken
 Rebecca Tamara as Zara
 Fatmasury Dahlan as Nina
 Ferdi Ali as Permadi
 Naomi Zaskia as Nia
 Fellicya Reyni as Kayla
 Harini Sondakh as Yolanda
 Zahra Qareen as Siska
 Ammar Zoni as Ammar Mahendra
 Deva Mahenra as Sal Pradipta
 Irene Librawati as Wanda
 Binyo Rombot as Riza
 Rendi Jhon as Ricky Alexander Tanujaya
 Anastasya Panggabean as Felicia
 Abel Syahputra as Ipul 
 Erick Arion as Sodikin
 Iwan Botak as Boim
 Teuku Dino as Iqbal Kusumahadi
 Naufal Alnauf as Hendry
 Achmad Syahriyatno as Jimmy
 Derie Febrian as Putra
 Ovi Sovianti as Nissa
 Setiawan Min as Tobbi
 Shirley Margaretha as Malika
 Crystal Aurora as Joanna
 Rherenata Wijaya as Erina
 Sigit del Ramdani as Yongki
 Oka Antara as Irvan Pratama Adicipta
 Fiki Alman as Royano Putra Alfahri
 Carlo Milk as Rafael
 Diego Afisyah as Gerry Bramasta
 Hanna V as Indira
 Denino as Martin
 Sonia Alyssa as Jennifer
 James Thomas as Jason
 Journey Kenzie as Renaldi/Aldi
 Evelina Witanama as Olivia
 Rara Nawangsih as Sofia Paramita Adicipta
 Rommy Sulastyo as Hartawan Alfahri
 Mariana Putri as Neneng
 Dede Satria as Irvan Pratama Adicipta
 Aliyah Faizah as Cantika
 Bima Samudra as Purnomo
 Rizky Tama as Ferry Orlando
 Soraya Van Kraayenoord as Astri
 Johan Morgan Purba as Nicholas Firdaus
 Boim Waw as Sumarno
 Anisa Ratna as Laras
 Alkha Sultan as Danu
 Cep Hendra as Felix Bharata
 Cassandra Angelie as Verawati Damayanti
 Yogi Tama as Anwar
 Selvina Mandasari as Utari

Special appearances 
 Lestari Nadibha as Tari
 Adhi Sastro as Adi
 Ade Nurulianto as Himself (Eps. 39)
 Andi Fadly Arifuddin as Himself (Eps. 39)
 Zaverio Mirza as Dio 
 Vabyra Mauriz as Iin 
 Dede Wijaya as Joshua Irawan
 Ainayya Afiqa as Cindy 
 Arick Pramana as Sakti
 Izhar Bima as Anak buah Aldebaran 
 Sixrion Anggoro as Dwi 
 Yessi Kenyang as Doctor 
 Abieza Arhabu as Aldebaran
 Boy William as Rendy's friend  
 Ridwan Kamil as Himself 
 Ranty Maria as Putri Aurora from Putri untuk Pangeran
 Verrell Bramasta as Pangeran Alexander from Putri untuk Pangeran
 Shirley Margaretha as Nawang Susilowati from Putri untuk Pangeran
 Reza Pahlevi as Raymond Turangga from Putri untuk Pangeran
 Minati Atmanagara as Soraya Gayatri from Putri untuk Pangeran
 Oding Siregar as Regar from Putri untuk Pangeran
 Harini Sondakh as Citra Marisca from Putri untuk Pangeran
 Evan Marvino as Atta Devandra from Putri untuk Pangeran
 Anrez Adelio as Gio Nathanio from Putri untuk Pangeran
 Naimma Aljufri as Dinda Silvana from Putri untuk Pangeran
 Galih Leo as Jojo Wahyudi from Putri untuk Pangeran
 Jefri Nichol as Jefri  to promote films My Sassy Girl
 Tiara Andini as Tiara  to promote films My Sassy Girl

International broadcasts

References

External links 
 
 
 
 

Indonesian drama television series
Indonesian television soap operas